Ray J. Nye (March 21, 1871 in Davenport, Iowa – June 17, 1937), was a member of the Wisconsin State Assembly and Wisconsin State Senate. He moved to Superior, Wisconsin in 1892.

Career
Nye served four terms on the Douglas County, Wisconsin Board, eventually becoming chairman of the board. He was a member of the Assembly in 1907 and again from 1911 to 1915 and of the Senate from 1919 to 1921. Nye was a Republican.

Nye died at the age of 66, after a year-long illness.

References

Politicians from Davenport, Iowa
Politicians from Superior, Wisconsin
County supervisors in Wisconsin
Republican Party Wisconsin state senators
Republican Party members of the Wisconsin State Assembly
1871 births
1937 deaths